Futuro–Maxxis Pro Cycling is a professional road bicycle racing team which participates in elite races. The team registered with the UCI for the 2019 season.

Team roster

References

Cycling teams established in 2019
UCI Continental Teams (Oceania)
Cycling teams based in Australia